Lucy Glover (born 25 November 1998) is a British rower. In 2021, she won a European silver medal in the quadruple sculls in Varese, Italy. She has been selected for the 2020 Summer Olympics.

References

External links

1998 births
Living people
British female rowers
Olympic rowers of Great Britain
Rowers at the 2020 Summer Olympics
21st-century British women
20th-century British women
World Rowing Championships medalists for Great Britain